This list consists of common foods with their cholesterol content recorded in milligrams per 100 grams (3.5 ounces) of food.

Functions
Cholesterol is a sterol, a steroid-like lipid made by animals, including humans.  The human body makes one-eighth to one-fourth teaspoons of pure cholesterol daily.  A cholesterol level of 5.5 millimoles per litre or below is recommended for an adult.  The rise of cholesterol in the body can give a condition in which excessive cholesterol is deposited in artery walls called atherosclerosis. This condition blocks the blood flow to vital organs which can result in high blood pressure or stroke. 
Cholesterol is not always bad.  It's a vital part of the cell wall and a precursor to substances such as brain matter and some sex hormones.  There are some types of cholesterol which are beneficial to the heart and blood vessels.  High-density lipoprotein is commonly called "good" cholesterol.  These lipoproteins help in the removal of cholesterol from the cells, which is then transported back to the liver where it is disintegrated and excreted as waste or broken down into parts.

Cholesterol content of various foods

See also
Nutrition
Plant stanol ester
Fatty acid

References

External links
 Cholesterol Information from the Centers for Disease Control and Prevention.

Nutrition
Food science
Food- and drink-related lists